{{DISPLAYTITLE:C13H10S}}
The molecular formula C13H10S (molar mass: 198.28 g/mol, exact mass: 198.0503 u) may refer to:

 Thiobenzophenone
 Thioxanthene

Molecular formulas